Gary van der Wege (born 1955) is an American wheelchair fencer from Kalamazoo, Michigan who won a gold medal in the 2011 Pan American Zonal Championship. Currently he works as a coach at both Salle Poujardieu and San Antonio Fencing Center.

References

Paralympic wheelchair fencers of the United States
1955 births
Living people
Sportspeople from Kalamazoo, Michigan
Wheelchair fencers at the 2004 Summer Paralympics
Wheelchair fencers at the 2012 Summer Paralympics
American male épée fencers